The Saint Louis University Mental Status Exam was developed in 2006 at the Division of Geriatric Medicine, Saint Louis University School of Medicine in affiliation with the Veterans Association as a screening tool for detecting mild cognitive impairment. The test was initially developed using a veteran population, but has since been adopted as a screening tool for any individual displaying signs of mild cognitive impairment. The intended population typically consists of individuals 60 years and above that display any signs of cognitive deficit. 
The SLUMS consists of 11 questions. Areas of assessment include: attention, immediate recall, immediate recall with interference, delayed recall with interference, numerical calculation, registration, digit span, visual spatial, executive function, extrapolation and orientation.

See also
 Addenbrooke's cognitive examination
 Mental status examination
 Montreal Cognitive Assessment
 Mini–mental state examination
 Informant Questionnaire on Cognitive Decline in the Elderly
 NIH stroke scale
 Self-administered Gerocognitive Examination

References

 2.) SH Tariq, N Tumosa, JT Chibnall, HM Perry III, and JE Morley. The Saint Louis University Mental Status (SLUMS) Examination for 
           detecting mild cognitive impairment and dementia is more sensitive than the MiniMental Status Examination (MMSE) - 
           A pilot study. Am J Geriatr Psych 14:900-10, 2006.

Mental disorders screening and assessment tools
Cognitive tests 
Neuropsychological tests
Geriatrics